Zeidane Inoussa (born 13 May 2002) is a Swedish professional footballer who plays as a forward for Spanish club Valencia CF Mestalla on loan from the French club Caen.

Club career
Inoussa made his professional debut with Caen in 3–0 Ligue 2 win over Rodez AF on 12 September 2020.

On 31 January 2022, Inoussa joined Real Murcia in Spain on loan. On 18 July 2022, he returned to Real Murcia on a new loan for the 2022–23 season. On 31 January 2023, Inoussa moved on a new loan to Valencia CF Mestalla.

International career
Born in Sweden, Inoussa is of Beninese descent. He is a youth international for Sweden.

References

External links
 
 SM Caen Profile
 Svensk Fotbol Profile

2002 births
Footballers from Stockholm
Swedish people of Beninese descent
Swedish sportspeople of African descent
Living people
Swedish footballers
Sweden youth international footballers
Association football forwards
Stade Malherbe Caen players
Real Murcia players
Valencia CF Mestalla footballers
Ligue 2 players
Championnat National 2 players
Championnat National 3 players
Segunda Federación players
Primera Federación players
Swedish expatriate footballers
Swedish expatriate sportspeople in France
Expatriate footballers in France
Swedish expatriate sportspeople in Spain
Expatriate footballers in Spain